Kenichi Yamamoto may refer to:

Kenichi Yamamoto (engineer) (1922-2017), Japanese mechanical engineer and President of Mazda
Kenichi Yamamoto (mixed martial artist) (born 1976), Japanese mixed martial arts fighter
Kenichi Yamamoto (skier) (born 1922), Japanese cross country skier
Kenichi Yamamoto (yakuza) (1925–1982), founder of the Yamaken-gumi gang